di Rienzo, de Rienzo or Rienzo is a surname of Italian origin.  Notable people with this name include:

Andre Rienzo (born 1988), Brazilian baseball pitcher for the Chicago White Sox
Cola di Rienzo (c. 1313–1354), Italian politician and popular leader
Franca di Rienzo, Swiss/Italian singer
Libero De Rienzo (1978–2021), Italian film actor, director and screenwriter
 

Italian-language surnames